Mont-Bellevue may refer to:

Mont-Bellevue, Quebec, a borough of Sherbrooke, Quebec,
Mont-Bellevue Park, a recreational ski hill within the borough.